The 2020 Algarve Cup was the 27th edition of the Algarve Cup, an invitational women's football tournament held annually in Portugal. It took place from 4-11 March 2020.

The final was scratched and Germany was awarded the Algarve Cup as Italy had to fly home on 9 March due to the COVID-19 pandemic in Italy.

Teams

Draw
The draw took place on 7 January 2020.

Squads

Qualification
All times are local (UTC±0).

Knockout stage

Bracket

5–8th place semi-finals

Semi-finals

Seventh place game

Fifth place game

Third place game

Final

1 The final was scratched and Germany was awarded the Algarve Cup as Italy had to fly home on 9 March due to the COVID-19 pandemic in Italy: Germany were awarded a 3-0 victory by FIFA.

Final ranking

Goalscorers

References

External links
Official website

 
Algarve Cup
Algarve Cup
Algarve Cup
Algarve Cup
Algarve Cup
Algarve Cup